The William H. Bucher House, at 300 W. Main St. in Hillsboro, New Mexico, was listed on the National Register of Historic Places in 1995.

It is an irregularly shaped adobe house with a front gable.  It is New Mexico Vernacular in style.

References

		
National Register of Historic Places in Sierra County, New Mexico